Holacanthus is a genus of marine angelfishes (family Pomacanthidae). The eight species are particularly abundant near volcanic rocks and coral islands. Some are highly valued as food, but even more so for aquaria, as all are brightly colored.

Species 
The following species are classified within the genus Holacanthus:

References

 
Pomacanthidae
Marine fish genera
Taxa named by Bernard Germain de Lacépède